Kahare was a Nkoya kingdom in what is today Kasempa District, Zambia.

See also
Kabulwebulwe
Momba, Zambia
Mutondo

References
 State penetration and the Nkoya experience in western Zambia
 World Statesmen.org

History of Zambia